Gnorismoneura hoshinoi is a species of moth of the family Tortricidae. It is found in Japan (the island of Honshu), Korea and China.

The wingspan is 13–17 mm.

References

Moths described in 1964
Archipini